Hedgesville Historic District is a national historic district located at Hedgesville, Berkeley County, West Virginia. It encompasses 55 contributing buildings and one contributing site, the Town Spring.  Notable buildings include the Presbyterian Church and Manse, Ashton House, Robinson Log House, Hat Shop, Stuckey House, Westenhaver-McKee House, Mt. Zion Episcopal Church and Hedgesville Cemetery, Jacob Hull Mansion, and Bodine's Tavern.  Included are notable examples of Queen Anne and Greek Revival-style architecture.

It was listed on the National Register of Historic Places in 1980.

References

Historic districts in Berkeley County, West Virginia
Historic districts on the National Register of Historic Places in West Virginia
Queen Anne architecture in West Virginia
Greek Revival architecture in West Virginia
Houses in Berkeley County, West Virginia
Stick-Eastlake architecture in West Virginia
Carpenter Gothic architecture in West Virginia
National Register of Historic Places in Berkeley County, West Virginia